The 1974 United States Senate election in Wisconsin was held on November 5, 1974. Incumbent Democratic U.S. Senator Gaylord Nelson won re-election to a third term.

Major candidates

Democratic
Gaylord Nelson, incumbent U.S. Senator since 1963

Republican
Tom Petri, State Senator since 1973

Results

References

See also
United States Senate elections, 1974 and 1975

Wisconsin
1974
1974 Wisconsin elections